
Year 390 (CCCXC) was a common year starting on Tuesday (link will display the full calendar) of the Julian calendar. At the time, it was known as the Year of the Consulship of Augustus and Neoterius (or, less frequently, year 1143 Ab urbe condita). The denomination 390 for this year has been used since the early medieval period, when the Anno Domini calendar era became the prevalent method in Europe for naming years.

Events 
 By place 

 Roman Empire 
 April – Massacre of Thessalonica: Resentment among the citizens of Thessalonica (Macedonia) breaks out into violence after the arrest of a popular charioteer. Butheric, military commander of Illyricum, is murdered. Emperor Theodosius I  orders vengeance, despite the pleas for mercy by Ambrose, bishop of Milan; more than 7,000 inhabitants are massacred by the Roman army.
 Ambrose retires to Milan (residence of Theodosius I) and refuses to celebrate a mass in the emperor's presence, until he repents for ordering the massacre in Thessalonica. Theodosius, filled with remorse, kneels in humility and strips off his royal purple, before the altar of the cathedral in Milan, humbling himself before the church.
 The Visigoths and Huns, led by Alaric, invade Thrace. Stilicho, high-ranking general (magister militum) of Vandal origin, raises an army and begins a campaign against the Goths.
 Theodosius I brings an obelisk from Egypt to the Hippodrome of Constantinople.

 India 
 Rudrasena II becomes emperor of Vakataka in the Deccan Plateau (India). In the same year he marries Prabhavatigupta, daughter of the Gupta king Chandragupta II.

 By topic 

 Art 
 C. 390–401 – Priestess of Bacchus: Late Antiquity ivory diptych; documents the relationship of the senators Quintus Aurelius Symmachus and Virius Nicomachus Flavianus. It commemorates the marriage of the two families. The right panel is inscribed "Symmachorum", with an elaborately dressed priestess who makes an offer on an altar. It is now kept at the Victoria and Albert Museum in London.

 Religion 
 Jerome, having finished the Latin translation of the New Testament, begins translating the Old Testament.
 The Kama Sutra is revised by Vatsyayana.

Births 
 Bleda, king of the Huns (approximate date)
 Gao Yun, duke of the Xianbei state Northern Wei (d. 487)
 Prosper of Aquitaine, disciple and Christian writer (approximate date)
 Romanus of Condat, hermit and saint (approximate date)
 Simeon Stylites, Christian Stylite (approximate date)
 Xie Hui, general of the Liu Song Dynasty (d. 426)

Deaths 
 January 25 – Gregory Nazianzus, theologian and Patriarch of Constantinople (b. 329)
 Apollinaris of Laodicea, bishop and theologian
 Aurelius Victor, Roman historian and politician
 Chen Guinü, queen consort of Jin Xiaowudi
 Diodorus of Tarsus, bishop and monastic reformer

References